Čotrić or Cotric is a surname. Notable people with the surname include:

 Aleksandar Čotrić (born 1966), Serbian politician
 Jevta Savić Čotrić ( 1767–1821), Serbian politician and diplomat
 Nick Cotric (born 1998), Australian rugby league player

Serbian surnames